The 2018 Erovnuli Liga (formerly known as Umaglesi Liga) was the 30th season of top-tier football in Georgia. Torpedo Kutaisi were the defending champions. The season began on 2 March 2018 and was ended on 8 December 2018.

Teams and stadiums

League table

Results
Each team will play the other nine teams home and away twice, for a total of 36 games each.

First half of season

Second half of season

Relegation play-offs

Both teams remained in their leagues respectively.

WIT Georgia are promoted to 2019 Erovnuli Liga.

Top goalscorers

Hat-tricks

 4 Player scored 4 goals
 5 Player scored 5 goals

References

External links
  
Georgian Football Federation

Erovnuli Liga seasons
1
Georgia
Georgia